Yongpyong Dome (용평돔) or Yongpyong Indoor Ice Rink (용평실내빙상경기장) is an indoor stadium in Daegwallyeong-myeon, Pyeongchang-gun, Gangwon-do, South Korea. It is part of the complex of Yongpyong Resort. Completed in 1998, it was constructed by Ssangyong, the then owner of Yongpyong Resort. It was originally built as the main stadium for the 1999 Asian Winter Games. At the games, it was the venue for the opening/closing ceremonies, figure skating and short track speed skating events. It was also the main stadium for the 2013 Special Olympics World Winter Games. It is the only indoor stadium in Pyeongchang.

Next to the dome, Pyeongchang Olympic Village, the main Olympic Village for the 2018 Winter Olympics will be located. The dome was used as the main dining hall during the Winter Olympics.

External links 
 https://www.yongpyong.co.kr/eng/group/group.do

Indoor arenas in South Korea
Sports venues in Pyeongchang County
Sports venues completed in 1998
1999 Asian Winter Games
Figure skating at the 1999 Asian Winter Games
Short track speed skating at the 1999 Asian Winter Games
Figure skating in South Korea
1998 establishments in South Korea
20th-century architecture in South Korea